Dagny Norvoll Sandvik (born 23 July 1990), known mononymously as Dagny, is a Norwegian singer and songwriter. She is known for her breakthrough single "Backbeat" (2016), EP Ultraviolet (2016) and debut studio album Strangers / Lovers (2020). Her songs have released to critical acclaim, with "Somebody" winning the P3 Gull 2020 Song of the Year. She has amassed over 450 million streams on Spotify to date. Her music is pop-based, incorporating elements of indie, dance, synth, electro and disco.

Early life
Dagny was born and raised in Tromsø in northern Norway. She is the youngest daughter of vocalist Marit Sandvik and jazz musician Øystein Norvoll. She has two older siblings, Juna and Bjørn.

In her early years Dagny described a love for performing, although was unsure about following a career in music. Her interest was later sparked following a songwriting assignment at school. Following encouragement from a teacher and her family, she began song writing and performing in her hometown.

Career

2008–2014: Early career 
Dagny began her music career performing locally in Tromsø. She wrote songs and performed with friend June Cecile Egerton, forming the duo 'June & Dagny.' After building a solid reputation in her hometown, Dagny moved to the United Kingdom in 2010, with June remaining in Tromsø. Dagny stated her move was in "the spirit of adventure." In retrospect she stated she felt lucky to experiment with music in her hometown, "[playing] live in peace for years before getting exposed to outside pressure."

Dagny initially lived in Liverpool, before settling in London the following year. She began performing in small club circuits and at pop-up events with her partner at the time Richard Craker. She released a handful of acoustic and folk-pop orientated songs under the EP Things We'll Never Say (2010).

By 2012 Dagny was traveling and performing between London and Tromsø, while also working part time in a clothes shop, wine bar and elderly home. She garnered positive attention from local press. The same year she landed significant roles as warm-up support for Elton John during the Vinter-Døgnvill festival and Sting for a performance in Bangkok.

In 2014 she went on to play at the UK's Isle of Wight festival, and also landed a supporting warm-up role for Bryan Adams during a tour of Austria.

2015–2019: Breakthrough, Ultraviolet 

By 2015 Dagny described how she felt her music career had stalled, stating "things weren't really going anywhere." She subsequently enrolled in university in Tromsø to undertake a degree in digital media design. After studying for six months, she returned to music following encouragement from her family.

In the autumn of 2015 Dagny recorded song "Backbeat." Described as having a "pounding indie-pop vibe", it quickly caught the attention of Zane Lowe at Apple Music's Beats 1 station. The song then appeared on Spotify's New Music playlist, achieving 300,000 plays in a few days. By mid-2016 the song had accrued over 20 million plays on Spotify. The acoustic version of the song went on to feature in the Grey's Anatomy episode "True Colors."

As a result of the song's success, Dagny received contracts with the record companies Propeller (covering Scandinavia) and Republic (for the rest of the world). Rob Stevenson said of her, "Backbeat immediately aroused our attention, and after a showcase in New York, our entire company fell in love with her." Following this, she was handpicked to play at the industry festivals Eurosonic, by:Larm and Trondheim Calling. In the same year, "Backbeat" was nominated for Song of the Year under Spellemann, while Dagny herself was nominated for Newcomer of the Year.

In 2016, Dagny released her follow-up single "Fool's Gold", which was the fourth most played on the Norwegian radio station P3. The same year she released her EP, Ultraviolet. The release won praise from both Norwegian and British publications,  with The Guardian describing it as an "exuberant but pensive riot of pounding drums, live instrumentation and just enough electronic flourishes to give it a modern edge, combined with some truly extraordinary songwriting."

In 2017 she released additional singles "Wearing Nothing" and "Love You Like That," garnering Dagny international recognition as 'One To Watch' for 2017 from both Billboard and VEVO. Dagny also undertook a cover of Rachel Steven's version of "More More More" which was used by Target in a commercial campaign introducing its line of new products in the fall of 2017. Following her growing success, she embarked on a number of collaborations, releasing singles with LCAW and NOTD.

In 2018 Dagny released the singles "That Feeling When" and "Used To You," alongside a cover of the Fleetwood Mac song "Landslide." She also partnered with Seeb for the single "Drink About", which was streamed over 200 million times and topped Norwegian charts.

In 2019 Dagny collaborated on a number of singles, including "Turn" with The Wombats and "Hit Your Heart" with Steve Aoki. The latter proved popular on club circuits, with Harper's Bazaar praising the song, urging readers to "add [it] to your weekend party playlist ASAP." The same year Dagny also was credited as a songwriter on Katy Perry's release "Never Really Over", which interpolated her single "Love You Like That". "Never Really Over" was a Top 10 hit across North America and Europe, becoming certified platinum in 2021.

In parallel with her releases, Dagny began establishing herself as staple performer on Norway's live music and festival scene. She frequently played popular festival spots at Øyafestivalen, Stavernfestivalen and Bergenfest and performed to sold-out shows across Norway, Europe, North America and Asia.

During this period Dagny was nominated a total of five times for the prestigious Spellemann Awards with her songs "Backbeat", "Wearing Nothing" and "Drink About" being nominated for Årets Låt (Song of the Year), and she herself being nominated for Årets Nykommer (Newcomer of the Year) and  Årets Låtskriver (Songwriter of the Year).

2020–present: Strangers / Lovers 

After a successful series of singles, Dagny left Republic to develop her own label, Little Daggers. She stated her reasoning for this was to have more freedom in pursuing an album, stating "I had 250 songs to work through, and people were looking for a massive hit but I much rather the idea of making a full record."

Dagny released her first album Strangers / Lovers in late 2020. The album launched in two parts, reflecting the different phases of a romantic relationship and the associated nostalgic feelings, with Dagny describing how "the idea of going from strangers to lovers and then back to strangers is brutal." Side A (which was first released in May 2020) tracks the beginnings of a relationship, with bright and upbeat songs like "Come Over" and "Somebody." Side B released later in the year (October 2020) and had a more melancholic focus relating to the end of a relationship, as evident in the tracks "Please Look At Me" and "It's Only A Heartbreak." Thematically Dagny also stated she was inspired by the long periods of day and night in northern Norway, stating "I wanted to make something that had both a light and a dark side. Side A is upbeat like summer, while Side B feels more like Autumn.” Additionally, a number of the songs were inspired by relationship elements in old films and TV shows Dagny enjoyed growing up. The song "Coulda Woulda Shoulda" is based on the episode of the same name from the American TV series Sex And The City (Season 4, Episode 11), while the song "It's Only A Heartbreak" is based on the classic film Casablanca. Speaking of the album's theme, Dagny highlighted how she wanted to capture the different feelings of relationship nostalgia, stating "I want to tell stories that mean something to me, but that others also can relate to. The goal is to pack one specific emotion into a single sentence.” Launching to acclaim, Strangers / Lovers was described as "one of 2020's most assured debuts." The second song of the album, "Somebody", went on to win Årets Låt (Song of the Year) for P3 Gull 2020.

In December 2020, Dagny starred in Season 2 of the Netflix series Home for Christmas as the character Lisa. The acoustic version of her hit single "Somebody" and the song "Bye Bye Baby" from Strangers / Lovers also made appearances in the show.

In January 2021 Dagny was invited to per form her catalogue with the Norwegian Radio Orchestra (KORK to celebrate its 75th birthday.

In late 2021, Dagny co-performed the song "Pretty" with fellow Norwegian artist Astrid S for the soundtrack to the romantic comedy The Hating Game (2021). Her song "Somebody" also formed part of the soundtrack.

As of December 2022, Dagny has released two new singles, "Brightsider" and "Highs & Lows."

Artistry 
A mixture of pop with upbeat elements of indie and dance, Dagny's songs have been described as "effervescent", "shimmering" and "luminous." Dagny herself states her musical preference falls around “pop songs with a little bit of an indie, left of centre vibe.” She also described how her upbringing in northern Norway has influenced her approach to both music and life, being "tough on the outside but warmhearted on the inside."

Dagny herself has described the importance of her songs having meaning, stating during the song writing process she asks herself: "What do I have to say? What do I have to tell?" Dagny also describes how she "[wants] to tell stories that mean something to [her], but that others also can relate to," adding, "the goal is to pack one specific emotion into a single sentence.”

Dagny has cited a wide variety of musical inspirations, including The Cardigans, Eva Cassidy, Robyn and Veronica Maggio. Dagny has also specifically cited the influence of the Spice Girls growing up, stating her love for performing as Mel B when she was younger. Of note Dagny describes how her love of performing as a child fueled her passion for performing concerts and live tours.

Personal life 
Dagny enjoys outdoor pursuits including swimming, hiking and bicycling, alongside vintage shopping.

Dagny's favorite color is pink, reflected in the cover of her debut album Strangers / Lovers.

Dagny is a brand ambassador for the cosmetic company Clarins.

Discography

Albums

EPs

Singles

As lead artist

As featured artist

Tours
Supporting act
Sting's Back to Bass Tour (Thailand, 2012)
Elton John's Greatest Hits Tour (America, 2012)
Bryan Adams's Reckless 30th Anniversary Tour 2014–2015 (Austria and Norway, 2014)
The Coronas' Trust the Wire (Royal Hospital Kilmainham, Dublin, 2017)
LANY's The LANY Tour: Part 2 (North America, 2017)
Picture This (band)’ MDRN LV Tour 2019  (Dublin, Ireland, 2019)

Awards and nominations

References

External links
 



1990 births
Living people
Norwegian pop singers
Musicians from Tromsø
21st-century Norwegian singers
21st-century Norwegian women singers